Scotinotylus sacer is a species of sheet weaver found in the Holarctic. It was described by Crosby in 1929.

References

Linyphiidae
Spiders of Europe
Holarctic spiders
Spiders described in 1929